The 1975–76 NBA season was the Rockets' 9th season in the NBA and 5th season in the city of Houston as well as their first season at The Summit.

Roster

Regular season

Season standings

Record vs. opponents

Awards and records
Joe Meriweather, NBA All-Rookie Team 1st Team

References

Houston Rockets seasons
Houston